Ettore Bassi, full name Ettore Francesco Maria Bassi  (born 16 April 1970), is an Italian actor and television presenter.

Biography 
Having loved magic since he was a child, he decided to study to become a magician and began to work as an animator in tourist villages. At the age of 19 he started his training as an actor attending the Acting School at Tangram Teatro di Torino. In 1992 he participated in the TV program Il più bello d'Italia, winning the title as the best talent. In 1993 he debuted as a television presenter in the TV program of Rai 1, La Banda dello Zecchino. In 1994 he started his career as an actor in the TV miniseries Italian Restaurant, directed by Giorgio Capitani. Since then and for many years he has been alternating his work between television presenter and actor of fiction, photo-romances, cinema, and theatre.

In 2000, alongside Pope John Paul II, he presented the Jubilee World Youth Day, broadcast all over the world. He became famous in Italy playing the role of Marshal Andrea Ferri in the TV series Carabinieri from 2002 to 2005. In 2003 he won the title of Telegrolla d'oro as the best actor of Italian fiction. In 2005 he received the Agesp Prize for the Best TV Fiction at the Busto Arsizio Film Festival. In the same year he tried his hand at car racing, following his passion for motoring, inherited from his father. This passion he has for the sport has garnered for him some success.

In 2005 he played in the TV miniseries Imperium: Saint Peter, directed by Giulio Base, and Pope John Paul II, directed by John Kent Harrison. From 2006 to 2007, he played the role of the paediatrician Corrado Milani in the TV series Nati ieri, bringing to this character some features of his own, like playing magic tricks to children. In 2007, alongside Giuseppe Fiorello, he played the role of Giorgio Piromallo in the TV miniseries St. Giuseppe Moscati: Doctor to the Poor, directed by Giacomo Campiotti. In the same year he played the role of Saint Francis of Assisi in the TV miniseries Clare and Francis, directed by Fabrizio Costa. In 2008 he received the Sant'Antonio International Award for the Television category for this interpretation.

In 2009 he played the protagonist in the TV mini-series Mal'aria. In 2010 it was announced that he would be the successor of Kaspar Capparoni in the Austrian-Italian police TV series Inspector Rex. He played in the 14th and 15th season of the TV series Inspector Rex where he interpreted the role of Inspector Davide Rivera. In 2014 he played in the movie Maldamore, then he performed in TV series Fuoriclasse and È arrivata la felicità. In 2015, along with his daughters, he presented the TV program Quando Mamma non c'è.

Alongside television work, he was  involved with the theatre, playing in performances, such as Il muro (The Wall), a small rock opera inspired by Pink Floyd's music, Trappola mortale (Deathtrap), for which he won the Charlot Theatre Prize in 2015, L'amore migliora la vita, Il sindaco pescatore. In 2016 he received the Monopoli City Prize for the Performance category. In 2017 he played in the stage musical The Bodyguard - Guardia del corpo, where he interpreted the role of Frank Farmer, who in the original film of 1992 was Kevin Costner.

Filmography

Cinema 
 What Girls Never Say, directed by Carlo Vanzina (2000) 
 La regina degli scacchi, directed by Claudia Florio (2001) 
 Promessa d'amore, directed by Ugo Fabrizio Giordani (2004) 
 Taxi Lovers, directed by Luigi Di Fiore (2005)
 Forget You Not (Per non dimenticarti), directed by Mariantonia Avati (2006) 
 This Night Is Still Ours (Questa notte è ancora nostra), directed by Paolo Genovese and Luca Miniero (2008) 
 La vita dispari, directed by Luca Fantasia (2011) 
 Maldamore, directed by Angelo Longoni (2014)
 Finché giudice non ci separi, directed by Toni Fornari e Andrea Maia (2018)

 Television 
 Italian Restaurant, directed by Giorgio Capitani - TV miniseries, episode 1x06 (1994)
 I ragazzi del muretto 3 - TV series (1996) 
 Il maresciallo Rocca 1 - TV series, episode 1x07 (1996) 
 Un posto al sole - soap opera (1997)
 Un medico in famiglia - TV series, episode 1x27 (1999) 
 Casa famiglia, directed by Riccardo Donna - TV series (2001-2003) 
 Carabinieri - TV series (2002-2005) 
 Imperium: Saint Peter (San Pietro), directed by Giulio Base - TV miniseries (2005)  
 Pope John Paul II, directed by John Kent Harrison - TV miniseries (2005) 
 Der Todestunnel, directed by Dominique Othenin-Girard - TV film (2005) 
 Nati ieri, directed by Carmine Elia, Paolo Genovese, and Luca Miniero - TV series (2006-2007)  
 St. Giuseppe Moscati: Doctor to the Poor (Giuseppe Moscati - L'amore che guarisce), directed by Giacomo Campiotti - TV miniseries (2007) 
 Clare and Francis (Chiara e Francesco), directed by Fabrizio Costa - TV miniseries (2007)
 Bakhita, directed by Giacomo Campiotti - TV miniseries (2009) 
 Mal'aria, directed by Paolo Bianchini - TV miniseries (2009) 
 Il sorteggio, directed by Giacomo Campiotti - TV film (2010) 
 Pius XII - Under the Roman Sky (Sotto il cielo di Roma), directed by Christian Duguay - TV miniseries (2010) 
 Inspector Rex (Rex) - TV series (2012-2013) 
 Un matrimonio, directed by Pupi Avati - TV miniseries, episode 1x06 (2014) 
 Fuoriclasse, directed by Riccardo Donna and Tiziana Aristarco - TV series (2014-2015) 
 A testa alta - I martiri di Fiesole, directed by Maurizio Zaccaro - TV film (2014) 
 È arrivata la felicità, directed by Riccardo Milani and Francesco Vicario - TV series (2015) 
 Boris Giuliano - Un poliziotto a Palermo, directed by Ricky Tognazzi - TV miniseries (2016) 
 La porta rossa, directed by Carmine Elia - TV series (2017-2019)
 L'isola di Pietro, directed by Giulio Manfredonia - TV series (2018)

 Short films 
 Io ti voglio bene assai, directed by Fernando Muraca (2006)
 Pentito, directed by Marcello Conte (2006)
 Sali e Tabacchi, directed by Fabio Di Credico and Tommy Dibari (2006)
 Detenuto senza colpa, directed by Andrea Costantini (2015)

 Advertising 
 Shampoo Johnson (1992)
 Telecom (1994-1996)
 Unica 5 (2009)
 Nurith, directed by Andrea Costantini (2012)

 Dubbing 
 Mark Consuelos in American Horror Story Theatre 
 Uno sguardo dal ponte, directed by Teodoro Cassano (1996/1998)
 Adorabili amici, written by Carole Greep, directed by Patrick Rossi Gastaldi (2008)
 La grande cena, directed by Camilla Cuparo (2009)
 Banda (dis)armata, directed by Roberto Marafante (2010)
 Il muro, directed by Angelo Longoni (2013)
 Trappola Mortale, directed by Ennio Coltorti (2013/2015)
 L'amore migliora la vita, directed by Angelo Longoni (2015/2017)
 Il sindaco pescatore, directed by Enrico Maria Lamanna (2015/2019)
 Miles Gloriosus, directed by Cristiano Roccamo (2016)
 The Bodyguard - Guardia del corpo, il Musical, directed by Federico Bellone (2017)
 Anfitrione, directed by Cristiano Roccamo (2017)
 Pseudolo, directed by Cristiano Roccamo (2018)
 Mi amavi ancora..., directed by Stefano Artissunch (2019)
 L'attimo Fuggente, directed by Marco Iacomelli (2019)

 Television programs 
 Piacere Raiuno (Rai 1, 1991) 
 Buon pomeriggio (Rete 4, 1992) 
 A casa nostra (Rete 4, 1992)
 Il più bello d'Italia (Rete 4, 1992) – winner
 La Banda dello Zecchino (Rai 1, 1993, 1999-2001) – presenter
 Tutti a casa (Rai 1, 1994) – member of Cavazza family
 Disney Club (Rai 1, 1995) – presenter
 Zap Zap (TMC, 1996, 1998-1999) – presenter
 Lo Zecchino d'Oro, 43°-44° editions (Rai 1, 2000-2001) – presenter
 Giornata Mondiale della Gioventù, the Jubilee (Rai 1, 2000) – presenter
 Festa della mamma (Rai 1, 2000-2001) – presenter
 Concerto di primavera (Rai 1, 2001-2002) – presenter
 Luce del mondo, sale della terra (Rai 1, 2002) – presenter
 Ma che domenica (Rai 1, 2002) – presenter
 Cosa non farei (Rete 4, 2004) – presenter
 Acchiappo i sogni (Rai Premium, 2014-2015) – presenter
 Quando mamma non c'è (Sky Gambero Rosso, 2015) – presenter
 Ballando con le stelle (Rai 1, 2019)

 Radio programs Voci della Luna (Radionorba e Radionorba TV, 2018-2019) – presenter

 Award 
 2003 - Telegrolla d'oro - the best actor of fiction 
 2005 - Agesp Prize for the Best TV Fiction at the Busto Arsizio Film Festival
 2008 - Sant'Antonio International Award for the Television category
 2015 - Charlot Theatre Prize
 2016 - Monopoli City Prize for the Performance category

 References The information in this article is based on that in its italy equivalent''.

External links 
 Sito ufficiale di Ettore Bassi
 

1970 births
Italian male actors
Male beauty pageant winners
Italian television presenters
Living people